Alsvik is a Norwegian surname. Notable people with the surname include:

Hans Christian Alsvik (1936–2011), Norwegian television presenter
Peder Alsvik (1882–1964), Norwegian politician

Norwegian-language surnames